Khwairakpam Chaoba Singh (1895 in Uripok Sorbon Thingen leikai, Imphal – 1950) was a poet, essayist, prose-writer and novelist. He was influenced by Sanskrit tradition and is regarded as one of the best known writers of modern Meitei literature. 
He founded the Manipuri Sahitya Sammelini of Meitei literature along with Dr. Lamabam Kamal Singh, Hijam Irabot and Hijam Anganghal
He adapted Thomas Gray's poem Elegy Written in a Country Churchyard into Meitei as Awaba ishei and included in his 1946 poem Thainagi Leirang (Ancient Flower), a poem which "laments the sad and poor life of country men who died unsung and unhonored".

Biography
He presented the first historical novel in Meitei – Lavangalata which is considered to be an outstanding work. This is perhaps one of the greatest novels in Meitei literature. His other prose works are Wakhalgi Ichen (Thought Current), Wakhal (Thought), Phidam (Ideal), Kannaba Wa (Useful Words) and Chhatra Macha (Student). He also wrote incomplete works Madhu Malati and Naba-Malika His published work includes:

 Chhatra Macha, 1923
 Kannaba Wa, 1924
 Phidam
 Wakhal
 Wakhalgi Ichen
 Thainagi Leirang, Poetry, 1933
 Lavangalata, Novel, 1937

Recognition and reception
He was awarded the Sahitya Ratna by the Manipur Sahitya Parishad in 1948. Fellow author and poet Elangbam Dinamani Singh included Chaoba in his one of his books about criticism of poets. In Amaresh Datta's Encyclopedia of Indian Literature, Volume 1, he says of Chaoba: "By use of common language and very homely image, [he] could set a good example of elegy in Meitei through this single poem. In fact, many of the poems of [his] contain eelegaic elements and atmosphere, as he looks upon the human life from a melancholic and tragic standpoint. This feeling comes to him from his love of everything Manipuri, the flora and fauna, the disintegrated tradition, which was once the beacon light and his deep involvement with the lot of man in his life. Therefore, when he writes about aunt ng, an elegaic feeling pervades his mind and as a result, his expression becomes melancholic and elegaic in nature".

References 

1895 births
1950 deaths
20th-century Indian poets
Indian male poets
Poets from Manipur
20th-century Indian male writers